Microdipnites is a genus of ground beetles in the family Carabidae. There are about six described species in Microdipnites.

Species
These six species belong to the genus Microdipnites:
 Microdipnites kahuzianus (Basilewsky, 1951)
 Microdipnites mahnerti Garetto & Giachino, 1999
 Microdipnites minutissimus (Basilewsky, 1954)
 Microdipnites perreti Garetto & Giachino, 1999
 Microdipnites vanschuytbroecki Bruneau de Miré, 1990
 Microdipnites zicsii Giachino, 2015

References

Trechinae